Damian Collier is a British entrepreneur, businessman, lawyer, and producer. He is the founder and former owner and CEO of Spiral Viral, a company designed to help the creators of unexpectedly viral videos with the legal side of things, and the founder, owner, and CEO of Blend Media, a VR licensing firm and marketplace. He produced the musical, filming, and tour of Jeff Wayne's The War of the Worlds - Alive on Stage! and manages the Jeff Wayne Music Group. Other film productions include War of the Worlds. In 2014, he appeared on Fast Company's Most Creative People in Business 1000.

Education
Collier attended University of Reading's School of Law and subsequently worked at firms including Latham & Watkins, Goldman Sachs, and Linklaters, the latter of which he stayed with from 1993 until 2003. He also briefly attended the University of Salamanca in Spain.

Career
Collier is the managing director of Jeff Wayne Music Group and in 2006 produced the tour for The War of the Worlds - Alive on Stage! He and Wayne collaborated with Dark Horse Entertainment to create an accompanying comic. While promoting Wayne's newest concept album, Collier met with Howard Davies-Carr, the father of the boys in the viral video "Charlie Bit My Finger," as they wanted to use the video for promotional purposes. Davies-Carr mentioned that he had been approached many times by people and companies wanting to use the video and Collier realized that the people behind viral videos were not being supported. As a former finance lawyer, with experience in licensing and intellectual property, he created Viral Management Limited, called Viral Spiral, in 2011 to help manage viral videos; the Davies-Carr family was his first client. Jeff Wayne was his business partner. Clients included the creators behind "Sneezing Baby Panda," "Talking Twin Babies," and "Fenton!" By 2012, Viral Spiral had offices in the United Kingdom, United States, and Japan, and had "plans for a You've Been Framed!-style television show" Viral Spiral set up deals for their clients with major companies such as The Coca-Cola Company, Samsung, BBC, and Comedy Central. They also partnered with Rightster to make more "Charlie" content, including partnerships with Sprint and Google, and gave the company "exclusive distribution rights to all of Viral Spiral's YouTube content." Viral Spiral was among the first multi-channel networks to sign Vine stars as clients. In 2014, Collier sold the company to the Rightster Group.

In 2016, Collier founded Blend Media, a company that licenses AR, MR, VR, and 360-degree content and connects brands and agencies with qualified content creators. Blend Media is involved with influencer marketing as well. In 2019, he became the executive producer of a VR game based on Jeff Wayne's The War of the Worlds and in 2021, helped turn "Charlie Bit Me" into a limited-edition NFT.

Personal life
Collier is married to actress Anna-Marie Wayne, daughter of his business partner Jeff Wayne. The couple have two children and as of 2022 live in the Hertfordshire village of Radlett. Their daughter was premature, arriving 9 weeks before she was due. Their son Jonah appears in Michael Hirst's 2022 television series Billy the Kid.

Film
Collier largely produced under the Damian Collier Entertainment banner between 2009 and 2015.

References

English film producers
English theatre managers and producers
Living people
1976 births
University of Salamanca alumni
Alumni of the University of Reading
21st-century English businesspeople
Businesspeople from London
English company founders
British technology company founders